Lethocerus insulanus is a species of giant water bug of the family Belostomatidae. Its common name is the giant water bug, but it is also called the electric light bug or giant fishkiller. These names are also used for various other members of the family, including the other Australian species, L. distinctifemur, which is similar to L. insulanus.

Distribution
The species is found in north-eastern Australia, particularly Queensland, but also northern New South Wales and the Northern Territory. It is also present in the Philippines and parts of Melanesia including New Caledonia and Papua New Guinea.

It lives in still, freshwater bodies such as lakes.

Description
It uses a posterior syphon like a snorkel to breathe underwater while hunting.

References

Belostomatidae
Hemiptera of Australia
Insects described in 1898